Melissa Price is the name of:

 Melissa Price (pole vaulter) (born 1977), American pole vaulter
 Melissa Price (politician) (born 1963), Australian politician

See also
 Melissa Myerscough (born 1979), American hammer thrower; born Melissa Price